Jim Daley (born 1951/1952) is a Canadian football coach, who currently serves as the special teams coordinator for the St. Francis Xavier X-Men. Daley is a longtime coach who served in the Canadian Football League from 1990 to 2014.

Daley started his CFL coaching career as the special teams coordinator for the Ottawa Rough Riders in 1992. Prior to coaching in the CFL he was the Head Coach of the Ottawa University Gee Gees from 1985-1990 and the Ottawa Jr Sooners from 1982-1984. In 1993 he moved from ST co-ordinator to DL coach. He quit during the season over management's insistence to play former NFL start Dexter Manley at DE over Lybrant Robinson. In 1994 he was hired by Saskatchewan to coach the LBs and was promoted to Defensive Coordinator in 1995. In 1996, he was named the team's head coach. He served as the team's head coach from 1996 to 1998, leading them to the Grey Cup in 1997 losing to the Toronto Argonauts 47–23.

He was the 25th head coach of the Winnipeg Blue Bombers. He became acting head coach after Dave Ritchie was let go part way through the 2004 season, and was named the head coach for the 2005 season. After the 2005 season he was let go, as the team finished in last place in the Western Conference. He was previously an assistant coach with the Bombers and before that the coach of the Saskatchewan Roughriders. With the Riders, he finished with a losing record in each of his three seasons as coach, but was able to lead the team on a run to the Grey Cup final in 1997, before losing to the Toronto Argonauts. Daley won the Grey Cup as an assistant with Calgary.

In 2007, Daley was hired by the CFL as a league official to work as senior director of officiating development. In 2009, Daley was hired by the Edmonton Eskimos as the team's Defensive Coordinator and Defensive Line Coach. Shortly following the 2009 season on December 9, 2009, Daley later resigned from his position.

On February 18, 2010, it was announced that Daley had re-joined the Saskatchewan Roughriders, this time as their special teams coordinator. It was announced on January 14, 2011 that his contract would not be renewed by the Roughriders.

On February 3, 2011, it was announced that Daley had joined the Hamilton Tiger-Cats' coaching staff as their special teams coordinator.

CFL coaching record

References

Living people
Edmonton Elks coaches
Canadian football people from Ottawa
Gridiron football people from Ontario
Ottawa Gee-Gees football coaches
Saskatchewan Roughriders coaches
Winnipeg Blue Bombers coaches
Year of birth missing (living people)